Tim Ole Naske (born 26 April 1996) is a German rower. He competed in the 2020 Summer Olympics.

References

1996 births
Living people
Rowers from Hamburg
Rowers at the 2020 Summer Olympics
German male rowers
Olympic rowers of Germany
Rowers at the 2014 Summer Youth Olympics
Youth Olympic gold medalists for Germany
21st-century German people